National Highway 2  is a national highway in India that runs from Dibrugarh in Assam to Tuipang in Mizoram. This national highway passes through the Indian states of Assam, Nagaland, Manipur and Mizoram. Before renumbering of national highways, NH-2 was variously numbered as old national highways 37, 61, 39, 150 and 54.

Route description 
NH2 connects Dibrugarh, Sivasagar, Amguri, Mokokchung, Wokha, Kohima, Imphal, Churachandpur, Seling, Serchhip, Lawngtlai and Tuipang.

Major intersections 
 
  Terminal near Dibrugarh.
  near Moranhat
  near Sivasagar
  near Jhanji.
  near Chantongia.
  near Mokokchung.
  near Mokokchung
  near Mokokchung
  near Kohima
  near Tadubi
  near Maram
  near Imphal
  near Imphal
  near Imphal
  near Imphal
  near Churachandpur
  near Vertek
  near Seling
  near Theriat
  near Lawngtlai
  near Venus Saddle

Asian Highways
Imphal to Kohima stretch of National Highway 2 is part of Asian Highway 1 and Asian Highway 2.

See also 
 List of National Highways in India
 List of National Highways in India by state

References

External links
 NH 2 on OpenStreetMap

AH1
National highways in India
National Highways in Assam
National Highways in Nagaland
National Highways in Manipur
National Highways in Mizoram
Transport in Dibrugarh